Fony is a village in Borsod-Abaúj-Zemplén County in northeastern Hungary. , the village had a population of 374.

Geography
Fony is situated on the west side of the Zemplén Mountains. It has road connections with Vilmány, Korlát, Regéc and Mogyoróska.

References

Populated places in Borsod-Abaúj-Zemplén County